Annick Papillon (born May 27, 1980) is a Canadian politician, who served in the House of Commons of Canada from 2011 to 2015. She represented the electoral district of Québec as a member of the New Democratic Party.

Biography 
Papillon was born in Rimouski, Quebec, and grew up in Quebec City. She earned a BA in public communications, law, and history and pursued advanced studies in journalism at Université Laval. She specialized in international politics and field journalism while studying at the Université catholique de Louvain in Belgium, and performed an internship at Radio-Télévision belge de la Communauté francophone. Back in Quebec, she volunteered for humanitarian organizations. At the time of her election, she worked for the Institut de la statistique du Québec.

Running in her first campaign, she defeated incumbent Bloc Québécois MP Christiane Gagnon with a margin of 7,709 votes in the 2011 Canadian federal election.

She endorsed Tom Mulcair in the 2012 New Democratic Party leadership election.

Papillon was defeated in the 2015 election by Liberal Jean-Yves Duclos.

References

1980 births
Women members of the House of Commons of Canada
French Quebecers
Living people
Members of the House of Commons of Canada from Quebec
New Democratic Party MPs
People from Rimouski
Politicians from Quebec City
Université Laval alumni
21st-century Canadian politicians
21st-century Canadian women politicians